The 7th WBPF World Championship was a major international competition in bodybuilding and fitness, as governed by the World Bodybuilding and Physique Federation (WBPF). It took place in The Mall Bangkapi Convention Center venue, Bangkok, Thailand from November 24 to November 30, 2015.

This championship was preceded by 2014 WBPF World Championship held in Mumbai, India and succeeded by 2016 WBPF World Championship held in Pattaya, Thailand.

External links

Bodybuilding competitions
Fitness and figure competitions
International sports competitions hosted by Thailand